Mark Ian Jenkinson (born 28 January 1982) is a British Conservative Party politician serving as the Member of Parliament (MP) for Workington since 2019.

Early life and career
Jenkinson was born in Whitehaven and raised in Workington. He was educated at St Joseph's Catholic High School, Workington and Newton Rigg College, Penrith, where he pursued agricultural studies, before joining British Steel as an apprentice. Prior to becoming an MP, he worked as a self-employed contractor in the nuclear supply chain.

Political career
Jenkinson was the UK Independence Party candidate for Workington in 2015. He was a founding member of UKIP's West Cumbria branch but quit in 2016, citing disagreements about the party's approach to the EU referendum and concerns over internal democracy.

After joining the Conservative Party, Jenkinson was elected in 2019 for the Seaton and Northside Ward of Allerdale Borough Council, where he became deputy leader in 2019. He was also chairman of Seaton Parish Council but  stood down after being elected as MP.

Jenkinson was elected to the House of Commons in the 2019 general election, defeating Shadow Environment Secretary Sue Hayman with a majority of 4,136 votes. Following his victory, Brexit Party leader Nigel Farage congratulated Jenkinson on Twitter, writing "A personal congratulations to Mark Jenkinson. He was an excellent UKIP candidate in 2015." Jenkinson's win marked the first time since the 1970s that Workington had elected a Conservative MP. Until then, the Labour Party had won the seat in every general election since 1979. The Conservatives had only been elected once in Workington since World War II, at a 1976 by-election. The constituency was seen as symbolic at the 2019 election, with a political think tank coining the term 'Workington Man' to represent the type of swing voter the Conservatives needed to win from Labour.

In October 2020, Jenkinson was criticised by Labour MP Jess Phillips after he stated that in his constituency in a "tiny" minority of cases “food parcels are sold or traded for drugs".

In February 2021, Jenkinson came out in defence of the decision to build a coal mine in West Cumbria, when the decision was overturned by Cumbria County Council.  The Guardian reported in March 2021 that Jenkinson was one of a number of Conservative backbench MPs on a potential collision course with the prime minister Boris Johnson over the decision to put a hold on plans to create a controversial new coal mine in Cumbria.

In February 2022, Jenkinson was made parliamentary private secretary for DEFRA.

From September 2022 to October 2022 he was an Assistant Government Whip.

In December 2022, he joined the Women and Equalities Committee.

Views on transgender issues

Responding to Essex Police marking Transgender Day of Remembrance, Jenkinson questioned whether they had planning permission for the commemoration, whether Essex Police were upholding the law, and questioned transgender people's legal protections. Writing on the website Conservative Home in November 2021, he said that erasing the notion of biological sex would cause harm to women and the "LGB community". He criticised the UK's gender recognition system and expressed concern that the proposed Gender Conversion Therapy Bill would see practitioners and parents who did not affirm their child’s chosen gender convicted, writing that "we can't put male-bodied rapists in female prisons can we?"

Personal life
Jenkinson is married to Dawn and has four children. They live in the village of Seaton.

References

External links

1982 births
Living people
People from Workington
UK MPs 2019–present
Cumbria MPs
Conservative Party (UK) MPs for English constituencies
Politics of Allerdale
UK Independence Party parliamentary candidates
People from Seaton, Cumbria